Rajeshwari Dholakia (born 26 December 1959) is a former Test and One Day International cricketer who represented India. She played four Test matches and 13 One Day Internationals for India.

References

1959 births
India women One Day International cricketers
India women Test cricketers
Indian women cricketers
Living people
Mumbai women cricketers